Abbondio is the name of:

People
 Abbondio Marcelli (1932–2015), Italian rower
 Abbondio Sangiorgio (1798–1879), Italian sculptor
 Abbondio Smerghetto (1931–2018), Italian rower
 Abundius, saint

Places
 Sant'Abbondio, former municipality in Switzerland
 Serra Sant'Abbondio, municipality in Italy

See also
 Abondio, surname
 Abundio, given name